Now That's What I Call Power Ballads is a special edition compilation album from the (U.S.) Now! series, containing power ballad rock songs mostly from the 1980s, and was released on March 24, 2009. It debuted at number thirty on the Billboard 200 albums chart in April 2009.

Track listing

Classic Power Ballads
On iTunes, the song, "Forever", by Kiss replaces the track, "Love Bites", by Def Leppard, and the album is titled Now That's What I Call Classic Power Ballads.

Chart performance

References

2009 compilation albums
Power Ballads